The 2007–08 Second League of the Republika Srpska season was the thirteenth since its establishment.

Group West consist of team from Banja Luka Region; Group Centre consist of team from Doboj Region, Brčko District and Bijeljina Region; Group South consist of team from Sarajevo-Romanija Region, Vlasenica Region, Foča Region and Trebinje Region

Group West

Group Centre

Group South

External links
Group West Archive at FARS 
Group West 2007-08 at BiHsoccer 
Group Centre Archive at FARS 
Group Centre 2007-08 at BiHsoccer 
Group South Archive ar FARS 
Group South 2007-08 at BiHsoccer 

Bos
3
Second League of the Republika Srpska